This is a list of marae (Māori meeting grounds) in the Manawatū-Whanganui region of New Zealand.

In October 2020, the Government committed $7,139,349 from the Provincial Growth Fund to upgrade 33 marae in the region, with the intention of creating 560.5 jobs.

Ruapehu District

Whanganui District

Rangitikei District

Manawatu District

Palmerston North City

Tararua District

Horowhenua District

See also
 Lists of marae in New Zealand
 List of marae in Taranaki
List of schools in Manawatū-Whanganui

References

Manawatu-Wanganui, List of marae in
Marae
Marae in Manawatu-Wanganui, List of